The Oyat is a river in Babayevsky District of Vologda Oblast and Podporozhsky and Lodeynopolsky Districts of Leningrad Oblast of Russia, a major left tributary of the Svir (Lake Ladoga basin).

The source of the Oyat is Lake Chaymozero in the western part of Babayevsky District. The Oyat flows to the northwest and enters Leningrad Oblast. In the village of Shandovichi it turns north. Upstream of the selo of Vinnitsy the Oyat accepts the Tuksha from the right and sharply turns southwest. It enters Lodeynopolsky District and in the selo of Alekhovshchina turns northwest. The mouth of the Oyat is located in the selo of Domozhilovo. Much of the valley of the Oyat in Leningrad oblast is populated.

The drainage basin of the Oyat includes the southern parta of Podporozhsky and Lodeynopolsky Districts, the areas in the west of Vytegorsky and Babayevsky Districts of Vologda Oblast, as well as minor areas in the north of Tikhvinsky District of Leningrad Oblast. There are many lakes in the basin of the Oyat, the biggest of them being Lake Savozero.

See also
List of rivers of Russia
Vepsian Upland

References

Rivers of Leningrad Oblast
Rivers of Vologda Oblast